Həsənabad (also, Sovetabad) is a village and municipality in the Neftchala Rayon of Azerbaijan.  It has a population of 6,915.

References 

Populated places in Neftchala District